Rajwada, also known as the Holkar Palace or Old Palace, is an important historical palace in Indore that was constructed by the Holkars of the Maratha empire, around 2 centuries ago. An example of the fine architectural skill and magnificence of those times, the palace is an impressive 7 storey structure that is placed near the Holkar Chhatris. One of the popular tourist attractions of Indore, Rajwada Palace is one of the oldest structures too. The construction of the palace was started  by Malhar Rao Holkar, the founder of Holkar Dynasty in the year 1747 A.D. This remarkable structure is placed in Khajuri Bazaar, right in the middle of the city. The Rajwada palace has the Shiv Vilas Palace on the right (New Palace) and faces a well-maintained garden that has a statue of Maharani Ahilya Bai Holkar, fountains and an artificial waterfall.

Structure 
The structure comprises two parts, the first one located at the heart of the city and the second one standing in the old part of the town. Rajwada palace exhibits a blend of Maratha styles, the palatial structure is sure to leave you shocked. The entrance itself is beautiful with lofty archway and a giant wooden door covered with iron studs. As one makes his way through the entrance, one is greeted with a courtyard comprising Maratha arched Ganesha hall, a number of balconies with Maratha ornamentation, windows, and corridors, surrounded by galleried rooms. The lower three floors are made of stone and the upper floors are made of wood.

The existing building is rectangular with cylindrical bastions at the four corners.
It was constructed in 1766 and later the southern part was rebuilt in the years 1811–1833 after being damaged by fire. Today it stands proudly with its 7-story façade of carved stone and wood jails, jharokhas and chattries. The front bay has substantial forecourt assessed by a large fenestration in the front façade.
The architecture is of the Maratha period & style. Planned with courtyards suited to tropical climes the Maratha architecture is known for its simplicity, visible visual logic & austere aesthetic, made rich by beautiful detailing, rhythm & repetition. The aisles & arcades, punctured by delicate niches, doors & windows create a space in which articulation of open, semi-open & covered areas is effortless and enchanting.
The Rajwada is now state property under the Archeology who granted special permission for restoring the old wada (residence) which was the main Rajwada which was heavily damaged during the 1984 riots, namely the building around the Tulsi Kund along with the temple that previously existed there, between the two rear courtyards. This building was to be restored by H.H Usha Raje Holkar and designed by architects Himanshu Dudwadkar and Shreya Bhargava on the 200-year-old blue print using the same material & finishes, while adhering to the seismic structural requirements, mandatory today.
The reconstruction of parts was to be identical to what existed earlier – constructed with thin bricks in lime mortar with lime plaster, with wooden columns with stone bases, rough black basalt flooring & a brick paved courtyard in tandem with the age-old building techniques.
The only departure from the original building was a concealed ms pipe frame for structural stability in this earthquake prone zone – a necessity to obtain relevant building permissions.

Gallery

See also 
Lalbagh Palace
Manik Bagh
Shiv Vilas Palace, Indore
Yeshwant Club, Indore
New Palace, Kolhapur of the Bhonsle Chhatrapatis
Laxmi Vilas Palace, Vadodara of the Gaekwads
Jai Vilas Palace, Gwalior of the Scindias
Shaniwar Wada, Pune of the Peshwas
Thanjavur Maratha palace of the Bhonsles
Narmada Kothi (Maharajah of Indore Retreat Palace), Barwaha

References

External links 

Buildings and structures of the Maratha Empire
History of Malwa
Tourist attractions in Indore
Palaces in Madhya Pradesh
History of Indore
Buildings and structures in Indore
Monuments and memorials in Madhya Pradesh
1766 establishments in India
Royal residences in India